Harri Klein (born 1 January 1942) is a Brazilian rower. He competed at the 1960 Summer Olympics and the 1968 Summer Olympics.

References

1942 births
Living people
Brazilian male rowers
Olympic rowers of Brazil
Rowers at the 1960 Summer Olympics
Rowers at the 1968 Summer Olympics
Pan American Games medalists in rowing
Pan American Games gold medalists for Brazil
Pan American Games silver medalists for Brazil
Rowers at the 1963 Pan American Games
Rowers at the 1971 Pan American Games